Baranovka is a rural locality (a selo) in Chernoyarsky Selsoviet, Chernoyarsky District, Astrakhan Oblast, Russia. The population was 28 as of 2010.

Geography 
Baranovka is located 11 km north of Chyorny Yar (the district's administrative centre) by road. Zubovka is the nearest rural locality.

References 

Rural localities in Chernoyarsky District